Werner Heisenberg (1901–1976) was a German theoretical physicist and one of the key pioneers of quantum mechanics.

Heisenberg also may refer to:

Other real people 
Benjamin Heisenberg (born 1974), German film director and screenwriter, son of Martin Heisenberg
Carl-Philipp Heisenberg (born 1968), German biologist
Jochen Heisenberg (born 1939), German physicist, son of Werner Heisenberg
Kaspar Ernst August Heisenberg (1869–1930), German historian, father of Werner Heisenberg
Martin Heisenberg (born 1940), German neurobiologist and geneticist, son of Werner Heisenberg

Eponyms from Werner Heisenberg 
 Pseudonym of Walter White (Breaking Bad), fictional character in the television series
Heisenberg (play), 2015 
 Asteroid 13149 Heisenberg
List of things named after Werner Heisenberg

See also 
 Eisenberg (disambiguation)
 Hessenberg (disambiguation)